Fogel is a surname of Yiddish/German origin. Notable people with the surname include:

 Aaron Fogel (born 1947), American poet
 Alice B. Fogel, American poet, writer, and professor
 Arthur Fogel, Canadian music executive and concert tour organizer
 Bryan Fogel, American film director
 Daniel Mark Fogel (born 1948), former President of the University of Vermont
 David B. Fogel (born 1964), American computer scientist
 Davy Fogel (born 1945), British soldier
 Eric Fogel (born 1969), American director, writer, producer, and voice actor
 Herbert Allan Fogel (born 1929), United States federal judge
 Horace Fogel (1861–1928), American baseball manager
 Jeremy Fogel (born 1949), United States federal judge
 Jerry Fogel (19362019), American actor 
 Lawrence J. Fogel (1928–2007), pioneer in evolutionary computation
 Robert Fogel (1926–2013), American economic historian and scientist
 Seymour Fogel (1911–1984), American artist
 Silvio Fogel (1949–2016), Argentine football player
 Steven Fogel (born 1951), British lawyer
 Vladimir Fogel (1902–1929), Russian silent film actor
 Daniel Fogel, real name of Dan Byrd (19532005), Belgian singer

See also 

 Fogle
 Vogel (surname)

German-language surnames
Yiddish-language surnames
Jewish surnames
Surnames from nicknames
ru:Фогель